Nikhil Kumar may refer to:
 Nikhil Kumar (governor),  IPS officer-turned politician, governor of Nagaland, and of Kerala
 Nikhil Kumar (actor), Indian actor and politician
 Nikhil Kumar (table tennis), American table tennis player
 Nikhil Kumar (chess player), American chess player